A bean pie is a sweet custard pie whose filling consists of mashed beans, usually navy bean, sugar, eggs, milk, butter and spices. Common spices and flavorings include vanilla, cinnamon and nutmeg. Variations can include cloves, ginger, pumpkin pie spice and lemon extract.

Bean pies are commonly associated with African American Muslims' cuisine as an alternative to soul foods, except those containing vanilla extract or imitation vanilla extract as they contain alcohol. The pies are also specifically associated with the Nation of Islam movement and Elijah Muhammad, who encouraged their consumption instead of certain ingredients associated with soul food.

Members of the community commonly sell bean pies as part of their fundraising efforts. The bean pie was allegedly introduced by Wallace Fard Muhammad, who was a restaurateur in the 1910s and 1920s prior to founding the Nation of Islam in 1930.

See also
 List of custard desserts
 List of pies, tarts and flans
 Pie in American cuisine

References

African-American cuisine
American pies
Cuisine of the Southern United States
Custard desserts
Legume dishes
Nation of Islam
Sweet pies
Soul food